Utah State Route 161 may refer to:

Utah State Route 161 (1933-1935), a former state highway near Woodruff 
Utah State Route 161 (1935-1953), a former state highway connecting Draper to Bluffdale
Utah State Route 161 (1961-1964), a former state highway in Beaver
Utah State Route 161, the modern route through Cove Fort

See also
 List of highways numbered 161